Ramazanlar can refer to:

 Ramazanlar, Biga
 Ramazanlar, Dursunbey